Red letter edition bibles are those in which the words considered as being spoken by Jesus Christ are printed in red ink.

History
The inspiration for rubricating the words of Jesus comes from Luke 22:20: "This cup is the new testament in my blood, which I shed for you." On 19 June 1899, Louis Klopsch, then editor of The Christian Herald magazine, conceived the idea while working on an editorial. Klopsch asked his mentor Rev. Thomas De Witt Talmage what he thought of a New Testament with the words of Jesus rubricated and Dr. Talmage replied, "It could do no harm and it most certainly could do much good."

Klopsch published the first modern red letter edition New Testament later in 1899. The first modern, fully rubricated bible was published in 1901. The rubricated bible instantly became popular, and is sometimes favored by Protestant Christians in the United States. Especially in King James Version editions, this format is useful because quotation marks are absent.

Qualifications
Because the original texts of the Bible do not have quotation marks, which words exactly are of Jesus has been interpreted, as opposed to explanatory text that follows them. For example, a footnote in the New International Version for John, 3:21 explains that "Some interpreters end the quotation after verse 15."

See also
 Red-Letter Christians
 BRG Bible

References

Further reading 

The New Testament of our Lord and Saviour Jesus Christ : (Authorized Version) with all the words recorded therein, as having been spoken by our Lord, printed in color., New York : Christian Herald, Louis Klopsch, Proprietor : Bible House, 1903, ©1899.
 Life-work of Louis Klopsch : romance of a modern knight of mercy, Charles M Pepper, New York : Christian herald, 1910.

Bible versions and translations
Christian terminology